Sumowo may refer to the following places:
Sumowo, Kuyavian-Pomeranian Voivodeship (north-central Poland)
Sumowo, Sejny County in Podlaskie Voivodeship (north-east Poland)
Sumowo, Suwałki County in Podlaskie Voivodeship (north-east Poland)
Sumowo, Warmian-Masurian Voivodeship (north Poland)